Jian'ai Township is a township in Luocheng Mulao Autonomous County, Guangxi, China.

Administrative division
As of 2021, the township is divided into one community and ten villages: 
Daban Community
Zhen'an
Ganfeng
Danxing
Jian'ai
Dilong
Zhenxin
Qing'an
Dazhu
Dingxin
Donghang

History
The region came under the jurisdiction of Tianhe County during the Qing dynasty (1644–1911).

In 1925 during the Republic of China, Huaiqun Township was set up.

After establishment of the Communist State, in 1952, it belonged to the Fifth District. In August 1958, its name was changed to Huaiqun People's Commune. In October 1984, Huaiqun People's Commune was revoked and Jian'ai Township was incorporated as a township.

Geography
The township is situated at the northwest of Luocheng Mulao Autonomous County. It is surrounded by Yizhou District and Huanjiang Maonan Autonomous County on the northwest, Naweng Township on the east, and Huaiqun Town on the south.

There are two rivers in the township: Jiujiang River and Qiexing River.

Economy
The economy of the township is strongly based on agriculture, including farming and pig-breeding. The main crops of the region are rice, followed by corn and soybean. Sugarcane and cassava are the economic plants of this region.

Demographics

The 2019 census showed the township's population to be 14,698, an increase of 2.6% from the 2011 census.

References

Bibliography

 

Divisions of Luocheng Mulao Autonomous County